The Blessed Vitas, O.P., or Wit (died ca. 1269) was a Polish Dominican friar from the Kraków convent and the first bishop in Lithuania (1253–1255).

Little is known about his origins, early career or his episcopal work. It is likely that he was a student of the first Polish Dominican, Hyacinth of Poland.

Following the conversion to Christianity and coronation of King Mindaugas during the summer of 1253, there was some delay in appointing a bishop for the Grand Duchy of Lithuania due to political intrigues. In October or November 1253, Pełka, Bishop of Gniezno, consecrated Wit and tasked him with the conversion of the Lithuanian people. However, he was not recognized by Mindaugas or accepted by the populace and his activities in Lithuania are unknown, although he is sometimes associated with Mindaugas' Cathedral.

In 1254, the priest Christian, a member of the Livonian Order, was appointed bishop and recognised by King Mindaugas with the grant of lands in Samogitia. In 1254, Vitas wrote to Pope Innocent IV about the deplorable conditions of Christians in Lithuania and asked for a transfer. On March 1, 1255, Pope Alexander IV granted Vitas' petition.

After leaving Lithuania, the Pope appointed Vitas as an auxiliary bishop of the Diocese of Wroclaw, where he served till about 1260, when he was made auxiliary bishop in the Diocese of Poznan, at least until 1263. Historian Jan Kurczewski believes that Vitas established a Dominican church and monastery in the city of Lubcha, in present-day Belarus.

Vitas is venerated as a "blessed" of the Order and there have been suggestions that he was martyred.

References

13th-century births
1260s deaths
Polish Roman Catholic missionaries
13th-century Roman Catholic bishops in Lithuania
Dominican bishops
Dominican beatified people
Roman Catholic missionaries in Lithuania